Marion County is located in the Ozark Mountains in the U.S. state of Arkansas. The county is named for Francis Marion, the famous "Swamp Fox" of the Revolutionary War. Created as Arkansas's 35th county in 1836, Marion County is home to one incorporated town and four incorporated cities, including Yellville, the county seat. The county is also the site of numerous unincorporated communities and ghost towns. The county included part of what is now Searcy County, Arkansas, with many opposing to dividing them, which helped fueled the bloody Tutt-Everett War between 1844 and 1850.

Occupying , the county's population was 16,826 as of the 2020 Census. Based on population, the county ranks 42nd of the 75 in Arkansas. Located in the Ozarks, the county is largely covered with rugged terrain and waterways, with the exception of King's Prairie in the southwestern portion. It is drained by the White River, Buffalo River, Crooked Creek, and the Little North Fork of White River. Protected areas of the county include Bull Shoals-White River State Park, Ozark National Forest, the Buffalo National River and four wildlife management areas (WMAs).

Although no Interstate highways are located in Marion County, two United States highways (U.S. Route 62 [US 62] and US 412) and eight Arkansas state highways run in the county.

History

Prior to white settlement, the Ozark Plateau was inhabited by the Osage Indians for centuries. Present-day Arkansas was under French rule from 1682 until the Spanish took over in 1762. The territory was returned to France in 1800 and then sold to the United States as part of the Louisiana Purchase in 1803. In 1812, the Territory of Missouri was formed, containing all of the Louisiana Purchase except the modern state of Louisiana. To manage this expansive and sparsely populated territory, counties were formed. New Madrid County, Missouri covered much of southeastern Missouri and the northern part of Arkansas. This county was eventually subdivided into Lawrence County, which was later subdivided into Izard County.

Marion County was formerly home to a large zinc mining industry. The ruins of the Rush Creek mining district are preserved as the Rush Historic District, which is listed on the National Register of Historic Places.

Geography

Adjacent counties
Ozark County, Missouri (north)
Baxter County (east)
Searcy County (south)
Boone County (west)
Taney County, Missouri (northwest)

National protected areas
 Buffalo National River (part)
 Buffalo National River Wilderness
 Ozark National Forest (part)

Demographics

2020 census

As of the 2020 United States census, there were 16,826 people, 6,782 households, and 4,438 families residing in the county.

2000 census
As of the 2000 census, there were 16,140 people, 6,776 households, and 4,871 families residing in the county.  The population density was 27 people per square mile (10/km2).  There were 8,235 housing units at an average density of 14 per square mile (5/km2).  The racial makeup of the county was 97.52% White, 0.12% Black or African American, 0.76% Native American, 0.20% Asian, 0.05% Pacific Islander, 0.13% from other races, and 1.22% from two or more races.  0.76% of the population were Hispanic or Latino of any race.

There were 6,776 households, out of which 26.00% had children under the age of 18 living with them, 61.30% were married couples living together, 7.40% had a female householder with no husband present, and 28.10% were non-families. 24.90% of all households were made up of individuals, and 12.40% had someone living alone who was 65 years of age or older.  The average household size was 2.36 and the average family size was 2.79.

In the county, the population was spread out, with 22.10% under the age of 18, 6.00% from 18 to 24, 23.30% from 25 to 44, 28.50% from 45 to 64, and 20.00% who were 65 years of age or older.  The median age was 44 years. For every 100 females there were 97.90 males.  For every 100 females age 18 and over, there were 94.80 males. The median income for a household in the county was $26,737, and the median income for a family was $32,181. Males had a median income of $22,877 versus $17,729 for females. The per capita income for the county was $14,588.  About 11.50% of families and 15.20% of the population were below the poverty line, including 23.50% of those under age 18 and 14.40% of those age 65 or over.

Government

The county government is a constitutional body granted specific powers by the Constitution of Arkansas and the Arkansas Code. The quorum court is the legislative branch of the county government and controls all spending and revenue collection. Representatives are called justices of the peace and are elected from county districts every even-numbered year. The number of districts in a county vary from nine to fifteen, and district boundaries are drawn by the county election commission. The Marion County Quorum Court has nine members. Presiding over quorum court meetings is the county judge, who serves as the chief operating officer of the county. The county judge is elected at-large and does not vote in quorum court business, although capable of vetoing quorum court decisions.

Politics
Over The past few election cycles Marion County has trended heavily towards the GOP. The last democrat (as of 2020) to carry this county was Bill Clinton in 1996.

Taxation

Property tax is assessed by the Marion County Assessor annually based upon the fair market value of the property and determining which tax rate, commonly called a millage in Arkansas, will apply. The rate depends upon the property's location with respect to city limits, school district, and special tax increment financing (TIF) districts. This tax is collected by the Marion County Collector between the first business day of March of each year through October 15th without penalty. The Marion County Treasurer disburses tax revenues to various government agencies, such as cities, county road departments, fire departments, libraries, and police departments in accordance with the budget set by the quorum court.

Sales and use taxes in Arkansas are voter approved and collected by the Arkansas Department of Finance and Administration.
Arkansas's statewide sales and use tax has been 6.5% since July 1, 2013. Marion County has an additional sales and use tax of 1.75%, which has been in effect since April 1, 2017. Within Marion County, the five municipalities each also have additional sales and use tax: Bull Shoals and Yellville levy an additional 2%, Flippin and Summit 1%, and Pyatt 0.5%. The Arkansas State Treasurer disburses state tax revenue to counties/cities in accordance with tax rules.

Communities

Cities
Bull Shoals
Flippin
Summit
Yellville (county seat)

Town
Pyatt

Census-designated places
Oakland

Townships
Note: Unlike most Arkansas counties, Marion County only has one single township (named "Marion County").  That township encompasses the entire county.

 Marion County

Infrastructure

Major highways

 US 62
 US 412
 U.S. Route 62 Business
 U.S. Route 62 Spur
 Highway 14
 Highway 101
 Highway 125
 Highway 178
 Highway 202
 Highway 206
 Highway 235
 Highway 268
 Airport Highway 980

See also
 List of lakes in Marion County, Arkansas
 National Register of Historic Places listings in Marion County, Arkansas

References

External links
 Map of Marion County from the U. S. Census Bureau

 
1835 establishments in Arkansas Territory
Populated places established in 1835